Keshava  is an 
epithet of Vishnu in Hindu tradition. Keshava means Parabrahman, according to Hindu scriptures. The name appears as the 23rd and 648th names in the Vishnu Sahasranama of the Mahabharata. Keshava is also venerated by those persons wanting to avert bad luck or ill-omens. His consort is Keerti (Lakshmi).

Etymology
Keshava means "the one with beautiful long (unshorn) hair" or "killer of the Keshi demon". According to the Padma Purana, the name refers to Krishna's long, beautiful, looking unshorn hair. Referring to Sangraha Ramayana of Narayana Panditacharya, Authors Meenakshi Bharat and Madhu Grover says that "The name Keshava refers to Vishnu. The letter 'Ka' refers to Brahma and 'Isha' refers to Shiva. The word Keshava refers to one who animates both Brahma and Shiva".

Literature  

A verse from the Vishnu Sahasranama mentions Keshava:

In Bhagavad Gita, Arjuna uses the name Keshava for Krishna a number of times, referring to him as the 'killer of the Keshi demon': 

The demon Keshi, in the form of a horse, was sent by Kamsa to kill Krishna, but was overpowered and slain (Vishnu Purana 5.15-16).

References

Sources
Dictionary of Hindu Lore and Legend by Anna Dhallapiccola

External links 
Krishna.com | All About Krishna
The Killing of the Kesi Demon

Titles and names of Krishna
Names of Vishnu